Paragongylidiellum is a monotypic genus of Asian dwarf spiders containing the single species, Paragongylidiellum caliginosum. It was first described by J. Wunderlich in 1973, and has only been found in India and Nepal.

See also
 List of Linyphiidae species (I–P)

References

Linyphiidae
Monotypic Araneomorphae genera
Spiders of Asia